The Singalila Ridge is a north–south mountain ridge running from northwestern West Bengal through Sikkim in the Indian part of the Himalayas. The district of Ilam in Nepal falls on the western part of this ridge.

The ridge separates mountain ranges of West Bengal from other Himalayan ranges to its west. The two highest peaks of West Bengal, Sandakphu and Phalut are located on the ridge. The Singalila National Park encompasses the ridge. It is noted for its views of Kanchenjunga and Mount Everest. The trek from Manebhanjan to Sandakphu and Phalut is popular amongst adventure travelers, as is mountain biking.

Summits
The four highest peaks are :
Falut 
Sandakphu   — the highest point in West Bengal
Tonglu 
Sabargram

Films 
Singalila in the Himalaya

References

External links

Landforms of West Bengal
Hiking trails in India
Tourism in West Bengal
Ridges of India
Landforms of Sikkim
India–Nepal border
Hiking trails in Nepal